The 2004 municipal elections of the Halifax Regional Municipality took place on 16 October 2004. Elections have been held every four years since the amalgamation of the cities of Halifax and Dartmouth, the town of Bedford and Halifax County into the Halifax Regional Municipality in 1996. The regional council is made up of twenty three councillors and one mayor, all positions were up for election.

There are no political parties at the municipal level in Nova Scotia, so all candidates run as independents. Voter turnout in the mayoral election was 48.39%.

Results

Mayor

Councillors

References

External links
Councillor election results Halifax Regional Municipality

2004
2004 elections in Canada